Agrotis dissociata is a moth of the family Noctuidae. It is found in Punta Arenas and Patagonia in Chile as well as the Neuquén and Mendoza provinces of Argentina.

The wingspan is about 34 mm.

External links
 Noctuinae of Chile

Agrotis
Moths of South America
Moths described in 1899